Heterachthes sablensis is a species of beetle in the family Cerambycidae. It was described by Blatchley in 1920.

References

Heterachthes
Beetles described in 1920